Zagość  is a settlement in the administrative district of Gmina Kobylanka, within Stargard County, West Pomeranian Voivodeship, in north-western Poland.

The settlement has a population of 14.

See also
History of Pomerania

References

Villages in Stargard County